University Grants Commission  may refer to:

 University Grants Commission (Bangladesh)
 University Grants Commission (India)
University Grants Commission (Nepal)
 University Grants Commission (Sri Lanka)

See also
 University Grants Committee (disambiguation)
 Higher Education Commission (disambiguation)